Al-Tai Football Club is a professional football club based in Ha'il, Saudi Arabia, that plays in the Saudi Professional League, the top tier of Saudi football. It was founded in 1961.

Al-Tai have won the Saudi First Division three times, first in the 1984–85 season and last in the 2000–01 season, and have finished runners-up once in the Saudi First Division once in the 1977–78 season. Al-Tai have finished third once during the 2020–21 and earned promotion to the Pro League for the first time since 2008. The club have won the Prince Faisal bin Fahd Cup for Division 1 and 2 Teams once in the 1993–94 season and finished runners-up once in the previous season. The club also finished as runners-up in the 1997 Crown Prince Cup. The club spent 22 non-consecutive seasons in the Pro League and won their first promotion during the 1977–78 season.

The club play their home games at Prince Abdul Aziz bin Musa'ed Stadium in Ha'il, sharing the stadium with city rivals Al-Jabalain, with whom they contest the Ha'il derby.

Honours
Saudi First Division (Level 2)
Winners (3): 1984–85, 1994–95, 2000–01
Runners-up (1): 1977–78
Third place (1): 2020–21
Saudi Second Division (Level 3)
Winners (1): 1976–77
Crown Prince Cup
Runners-up (1): 1997
Prince Faisal bin Fahd Cup for Division 1 and 2 Teams
Winners (1): 1993–94
Runners-up (1): 1994–95

Current squad 
As of 1 July 2021:

Out on loan

Managerial history

 Valdeir Vieira (15 June 1999 – 20 October 1999)
 Oliveira (21 October 1999 – 15 December 1999)
 Rubén Vásquez (15 December 1999 – 31 December 1999)
 Ion Dumitru (1 January 2000 – 1 May 2000)
 Lula (1 July 2000 – 27 December 2000)
 Pedro (27 December 2000 – 1 May 2001)
 Dário Lourenço (1 July 2001 – 4 December 2001)
 Khalil Al-Masri (5 December 2001 – 6 January 2002)
 Palhinha (7 January 2002 – 1 May 2002)
 Alexandru Moldovan (4 July 2002 – 19 January 2003)
 Khalil Al-Masri (19 January 2003 – 30 May 2003)
 Uli Maslo (1 July 2003 – 16 September 2003)
 Ahmad Al-Ajlani (17 September 2003 – 20 March 2004)
 Mohammad Karim Zouaghi (21 March 2004 – 31 May 2004)
 Ammar Souayah (6 June 2004 – 6 January 2005)
 Khalil Al-Masri (8 January 2005 – 6 May 2005)
 Khaled Ben Yahia (11 May 2005 – 30 May 2005)
 Ammar Souayah (7 July 2005 – 1 May 2006)
 Jorvan Vieira (4 June 2006 – 23 November 2006)
 Fernando Suárez (24 November 2006 – 3 December 2006)
 Khalid Al-Koroni (4 December 2006 – 1 February 2007)
 João Carlos (1 February 2007 – 1 May 2007)
 Fernando Suárez (1 May 2007 – 15 May 2007)
 Bernard Simondi (22 June 2007 – 8 November 2007)
 Fernando Suárez (18 November 2007 – 1 May 2008)
 Tahseen Jabbary (15 August 2008 – 8 October 2008)
 Abdellah Mecheri (11 October 2008 – 20 December 2008)
 Mohamed Aldo (24 December 2008 – 28 February 2010)
 Khalil Al-Masri (28 February 2010 – 1 May 2010)
 Ralf Borges Ferreira (4 June 2010 – 3 November 2010)
 Hedi Ben Mokhtar (28 November 2010 – 28 April 2012)
 Isac Doru (26 June 2012 – 19 May 2013)
 Paulinho McLaren (25 June 2013 – 17 December 2013)
 Bashir Abdel Samad (18 December 2013 – 29 June 2014)
 Khalil Al-Masri (2 July 2014 – 1 May 2015)
 Djamel Belhadi (1 July 2015 – 30 August 2015)
 Carlos Roberto (5 September 2015 – 23 February 2016)
 Habib Ben Romdhane (23 February 2016 – 31 May 2016)
 Juan Rodríguez (31 May 2016 – 20 November 2016)
 Amro Anwar (26 November 2016 – 10 January 2017)
 Makram Abdullah (10 January 2017 – 26 December 2017)
 Liviu Ciobotariu (27 December 2017 – 26 September 2018)
 Djamel Belkacem (29 September 2018 – 31 May 2019)
 Claudiu Niculescu (15 June 2019 – 29 October 2019)
 Dejan Arsov (30 October 2019 – 5 February 2020)
 Khalil Al-Masri (5 February 2020 – 7 September 2020)
 Víctor Afonso (7 September 2020 – 20 September 2020)
 Dragan Talajić (26 September 2020 – 10 November 2020)
 Mohamed Kouki (11 November 2020 – 28 August 2021)
 Zoran Manojlović (30 August 2021 – 4 November 2021)
 José Luis Sierra (7 November 2021 – 30 June 2022)
 Pepa (19 July 2022 – 22 January 2023)
 Mirel Rădoi (22 January 2023 – )

References

 
Football clubs in Saudi Arabia
1961 establishments in Saudi Arabia
Association football clubs established in 1961
Football clubs in Ha'il